Assara odontosema is a species of snout moth in the genus Assara. It was described by Alfred Jefferis Turner in 1913 and is found in Australia.

References

Moths described in 1913
Phycitini
Moths of Australia